Maksim Pezhemsky (born 30 March 1963) is a Russian film director and screenwriter. His film Perekhod tovarishcha Chkalova cherez severnyy polyus was screened in the Un Certain Regard section at the 1991 Cannes Film Festival.

Filmography
 Perekhod tovarishcha Chkalova cherez severnyy polyus (1990)
 Plenniki udachi (1993)
 Zhestkoe vremya (1998)
 Mama ne goryuy (1998)
 Kak by ne tak (2003)
 Mama ne goryuy 2 (2005)
 Univer (TV series, 2008)
 Lubov morkov 2 (2008)
 Our Russia. The Balls of Fate (2010)
 Interny (TV series, 2010)

References

External links

1963 births
Living people
People from Amur Oblast
Russian film directors
Russian screenwriters
Male screenwriters
Russian male writers